The 1997 Ireland rugby union tour of Oceania was a series of matches played in May in June 1997 in New Zealand and Samoa by the Ireland A national rugby union team, while the best Irish players where involved in the 1997 British Lions tour to South Africa.

Results 
Scores and results list Ireland's points tally first.

References 

1997 rugby union tours
tour
1997 in New Zealand rugby union
1997
1997
1997 in Oceanian rugby union